Chalk Mountain is a summit in the U.S. state of Nevada.

Chalk Mountain was so named on account of its mineral composition.

References

Mountains of Churchill County, Nevada